Davide Stirpe (born 1 August 1992) is an Italian motorcycle racer. He currently competes in the CIV Supersport 600 Championship aboard a MV Agusta F3 675. He has competed at national level in the CIV 125GP championship, the Honda RS125 GP Trophy (where he was champion in 2009), the CIV Stock 600 Championship and the CIV Supersport Championship (where he was champion in 2017 and 2021), at international level in the 125cc World Championship, the European Superstock 600 Championship and the Supersport World Championship.

Career statistics

Grand Prix motorcycle racing

By season

Races by year
(key) (Races in bold indicate pole position; races in italics indicate fastest lap)

Supersport World Championship

Races by year
(key) (Races in bold indicate pole position; races in italics indicate fastest lap)

References

External links
 

Italian motorcycle racers
Living people
1992 births
125cc World Championship riders
Sportspeople from Rome
Supersport World Championship riders